West to Glory is a 1947 American Western film directed by Ray Taylor and written by Elmer Clifton and Robert B. Churchill. The film stars Eddie Dean, Roscoe Ates, Dolores Castle, Gregg Barton, Jimmy Martin, Zon Murray, Alex Montoya, Harry J. Vejar, Casey MacGregor and Billy Hammond. The film was released on April 12, 1947, by Producers Releasing Corporation.

Plot

Cast          
Eddie Dean as Eddie Dean
Roscoe Ates as Soapy Jones
Dolores Castle as Maria
Gregg Barton as Jim Barrett
Jimmy Martin as Cory
Zon Murray as Bill Avery
Alex Montoya as Juan
Harry J. Vejar as Don Lopez
Casey MacGregor as Henchman
Billy Hammond as Henchman
Ted French as Henchman
Carl Mathews as Vincente 
Flash as Flash

References

External links
 

1947 films
American Western (genre) films
1947 Western (genre) films
Producers Releasing Corporation films
Films directed by Ray Taylor
American black-and-white films
1940s English-language films
1940s American films